The 2013 Tajik Cup was the 22nd edition of the Tajik Cup. The cup winner qualified for the 2015 AFC Cup.

Preliminary round

Round of 16

Quarter-finals

Semifinals

|}

Final

References

External links
Tajikistan Football Federation
RSSSF 2010

Tajikistan Cup
Tajikistan
Tajik Cup